ArmSwissBank CJSC is a private and investment bank founded in Yerevan in February 2005 after receiving its banking license N84 from the Central Bank of Armenia. Shortly after, the bank was also granted brokerage license (NBG 0064) and custody license (NPG 0065) to expand its activities. The bank collaborates with KfW and EBRD within the scope of renewable energy and corporate lending programs.

As a member of FCI (Factors Chain International), it has joined international payment systems such as Swift, CBANet and BankMail to ease transfers with correspondent banks : Commerzbank AG, UBS AG, Raiffeisen, UniCreditBank, etc.

In December 2010, ArmSwissBank was the sole underwriter for Artsakh HEK second IPO which fully raised USD 4.3 million in the Armenian Stock Exchange. For that same year, the bank won the title of the Best Exchange Member in Government Bonds Market by NASDAQ OMX Armenia.

See also

Economy of Armenia
List of banks
List of banks in Armenia

References

Banks of Armenia